Nebraska Highway 66 is a highway in central and eastern Nebraska. It is a discontinuous highway with four segments heading in a west-to-east direction. The first segment begins at Nebraska Highway 14 south of Central City and ends at U.S. Highway 81 south of Stromsburg. The second segment begins at Nebraska Highway 15 west of Dwight and ends at Nebraska Highway 79 in Valparaiso. The third segment begins at U.S. Highway 77 south of Wahoo and ends at Main Street in Louisville. The fourth and final segment begins at the intersection with Walnut Street and Koop Avenue in Louisville, and ends at U.S. Highway 34 and U.S. Highway 75 west of Plattsmouth.

Route description

Western segment
Nebraska Highway 66 begins at an intersection with NE 14 south of Central City. It heads eastward through farmland, passing through Hordville and Polk along the way. South of Stromsburg, it meets US 81 where the western segment terminates.

Middle segment
The middle segment of Nebraska Highway 66 begins at NE 15 west of Dwight. It continues in an eastward direction through farmland before ending at NE 79 in Valparaiso.

Eastern segment
The eastern segment of N-66 starts at an intersection with US 77 south of Wahoo. It again continues eastward and to the southeast into farmland, passing near the communities of Ithaca and Memphis. To the southeast, it enters Ashland where the highway will intersect with US 6.  Continuing to the southeast, N-66 intersects I-80 at exit 426. The highway continues eastward, passing through South Bend and heading to the southeast.  Southwest of Louisville, the route intersects with NE 50 and runs concurrently northward with it for just over a mile. Upon entering Louisville, N-66 splits off to the east. At Main Street near Mill Creek, this segment ends, as there is no bridge crossing over the creek. The highway resumes  to the east.

Far eastern segment
Still in Louisville, the far eastern segment of N-66 starts at the intersection with Koop Avenue and Walnut Street.  It continues eastward, exiting Louisville and entering farmland. Further to the east, the highway intersects with US 34 and US 75 just west of Plattsmouth. At this point, the highway ends.

History
Prior to October 24, 2005, the segment of Nebraska Highway 66 between U.S. Highway 77 south of Wahoo and U.S. Highway 6 in Ashland was designated as Nebraska Highway 63.  On that day, this segment was renumbered to the present designation of NE 66.

Major intersections

References

External links

Nebraska Roads: NE 61-80

066
Transportation in Hamilton County, Nebraska
Transportation in Polk County, Nebraska
Transportation in Butler County, Nebraska
Transportation in Saunders County, Nebraska
Transportation in Cass County, Nebraska